Anogeissus leiocarpa (African birch) is a tall deciduous tree native to the savannas of tropical Africa.  

It is the sole West African species of the genus Anogeissus, a genus otherwise distributed from tropical central and east Africa through tropical Southeast Asia.  

Anogeissus leiocarpa germinates in the new soils produced by seasonal wetlands. It is a forest fringe plant, growing at the edges of the rainforest, although not deep in the rainforest. It also grows in savanna, and along riverbanks, where it forms gallery forests.  The tree flowers in the rainy season, from June to October.  The fruit are winged samaras, and are dispersed by ants.

Ethnobotany
It is one of the plants used to make bògòlanfini, a traditional Malian mudcloth.  Small branches with leaves are crushed to make one of the yellow dyes.  

The inner bark of the tree is used as a human and livestock anthelmintic for treating worms, and for treatment of a few protozoan diseases in animals, nagana (an animal trypanosomiasis), and babesiosis.  

The inner bark is used as a chewing stick in Nigeria and extracts of the bark show antibacterial properties. The stem barks contains castalagin and flavogallonic acid dilactone.

Laboratory investigation of the effects of aqueous stem bark extract of Anogeissus leiocarpus, which contains antioxidants, indicates  that it provides dose-dependent benefits against gastric ulcers. The observed effectiveness is sufficient to support the ethno medicinal application of the plant in ulcer treatment and management.

References

External links

Trees of Africa
leiocarpa